Am Dam is the capital of Djourf Al Ahmar Department in Sila Region, Chad, located at an important crossroads in the Batha River valley. Am Dam is also the name of the Sub-Prefecture that the city is within. The population of the entire Am Dam Sub-Prefecture is 77,593.

The town is served by Am Dam Airport.

History
It was captured by rebels advancing on N'Djamena on June 15, 2008. A battle near the town stopped an attempted rebel offensive in May 2009 and put the town under Chadian government control again, with more than 200 reported deaths.

References

Sila Region
Populated places in Chad